Lighthorse or Light Horse most often refers to Light cavalry, but may also refer to:

2nd/14th Light Horse Regiment, Australian Army Regiment
3rd Squadron, 17th Cavalry Regiment (United States)
Australian Light Horse, mounted infantry who fought in World War I
1st Light Horse Brigade
2nd Light Horse Brigade
3rd Light Horse Brigade
4th Light Horse Brigade
5th Light Horse Brigade
Calcutta Light Horse, Indian Army reserve unit during the British Raj
Henry Lee III, nicknamed "Light Horse Harry"
Horse&Rider, magazine formerly called Light Horse
Light Horse Regiment, South African Army unit
Lighthorse (American Indian police)
The Lighthorsemen (film), a 1987 feature film about an Australian Light Horse unit
Rutherford's Light Horse expedition of July 1776
South Alberta Light Horse